The Verkhovna Rada of Ukraine of the 8th convocation was a convocation of the legislative branch of the Verkhovna Rada, Ukraine's unicameral parliament. The 8th convocation met at the Verkhovna Rada building in Kyiv, having begun its term on 27 November 2014 following the last session of the 7th Verkhovna Rada. Its five-year term came to an end on July 24, 2019, marking the end of its tenth session.

The 8th Verkhovna Rada's composition was based upon the results of the October 26, 2014 parliamentary election, which was contested eight months after the 2014 Ukrainian revolution which saw the overthrow of the Yanukovych regime. Ukraine's head of state during the parliament's term is President Petro Poroshenko. Eleven parties were represented in the Verkhovna Rada, although only six of them surpassed the mandatory five percent election threshold to gain representation based upon the proportional representation system.

On the first day of the parliament's session, five of the parliament's pro-European parties, the Petro Poroshenko Bloc, People's Front, Self Reliance, Fatherland, and Radical Party, signed a coalition agreement. Per the coalition agreement, the convocation of parliament was tasked with passing major reforms to ensure Ukrainian membership in European institutions such as the European Union and NATO, while dealing with the threat of further Russian aggression in the Donbass.

President Volodomyr Zelensky dissolved the 8th Verkovna Rada on 21 May 2019.

Post-election developments

Prior to the parliament's official swearing-in ceremony, Volodymyr Groisman was the chairman of the parliament's preparatory deputy group, with Oksana Syroyid as deputy, and Pavlo Pynzenyk as the secretary. Two deputies, Vitali Klitschko, and Ihor Palytsia rejected their parliamentary mandates to remain in office as Mayor of Kyiv and Governor of Odessa Oblast, respectfully. Meanwhile, the parliament's preparatory deputy group adopted a resolution which accepted Nadiya Savchenko's handwritten letter stating that she accepted her parliamentary mandate. Savchenko was held captive by the Russian government from June 2014 until May 2016, after being abducted during the pro-Russian unrest.

A total of 27 constituencies were not elected due to various events taking place in the country. A total of 10 constituencies in the Autonomous Republic of Crimea and two in the City of Sevastopol were not elected due to the 2014 Crimean crisis and subsequent annexation of Crimea by Russia, while a further nine constituencies in Donetsk Oblast and six constituencies in Luhansk Oblast were not elected due to the ongoing War in Donbass. Elections in these regions can only take place after the re-introduction of Ukrainian control over these territories.

Major legislation
 November 27, 2014: Arseniy Yatsenyuk is confirmed as Prime Minister for a second term with 341 votes in favor.
 December 2, 2014: The second Yatsenyuk government is approved with 288 votes in favor.
 December 23, 2014: Ukraine's status as that of a neutral country, one of the coalition's key points of action, is removed with 303 votes in favor.
 December 25, 2014: The National Security and Defense Council's jurisdiction and authority is expanded with 316 votes in favor.
 December 29, 2014: Along with a collection of other economic policy laws, the 2015 Ukraine budget is approved with 233 votes in favor.

Leadership

Leadership (November 2014 – April 2016)
On November 27, 2014, the parliament elected Volodymyr Groysman from the Petro Poroshenko Bloc as the Chairman of the Verkhovna Rada. The parliament's chairman, first deputy chairman, and deputy chairman are all unaffiliated people's deputies according to parliamentary procedure. Oksana Syroyid is the first woman to ever hold a deputy chairman position in the Verkhovna Rada.

Leadership (April 2016 – July 2019)

Members

Since November 28, 2014, the 8th Verkhovna Rada consists of a total of 420 people's deputies, which belong to one of six political party factions, two parliamentary groups, or the 38 unaffiliated people's deputies. For the first time in Ukrainian history, the Communist Party has failed to gain representation in the Verkhovna Rada.

Meanwhile, the Ukrainian Democratic Alliance for Reform (UDAR), which had 40 seats in the previous parliament's convocation, did not participate in the election independently. For the 2014 parliamentary election, UDAR merged their electoral lists with that of the Petro Poroshenko Bloc, being allocated 30 percent of bloc's electoral list.

A large portion of the 8th Verkhovna Rada are freshman people's deputies who did not have any prior legislative service. This convocation of parliament also has the largest representation of women in the Ukrainian parliament for the first time in history. While the women participation rate in parliament is lower than the 25.3 percent average of the OSCE member states, 49 of the deputies in parliament are women (approximately 12 percent).

Out of the newly elected deputies, 410 of them possess an academic degree; a further 144 deputies possess two or more such degrees. Fifty-four deputies are currently candidates for doctoral sciences, while 27 of them already possess a doctoral degree. The oldest member of parliament is the Opposition Bloc's Yukhym Zvyahilsky, who was elected from a constituency seat in northern Donetsk.

Parliamentary factions and deputy groups summary
Bold indicates majority caucus.
{| class=wikitable style="text-align:center"
|- style="vertical-align:bottom;"
! rowspan=3 | 
! colspan=9 | (Shading indicates majority caucus) 
! rowspan=3 | Total
! rowspan=3 | Vacant
|- style="height:5px"
| 
| 
| 
| 
| 
| 
| 
| 
| 
|-
! Petro Poroshenko Bloc
! People's Front
! Opposition Bloc
! Self Reliance
! Radical Party
! Fatherland
! Revival
! People's Will
! Non-affiliated
|-
! style="font-size:85%" | End of previous convocation 
| DNP
| DNP
| DNP
| DNP
| 1
| 86
| 41
| 35
| 93
! 445
| 5
|-
| colspan=12 style="background-color:lightgrey"|
|-
! style="font-size:85%" | Seats won in 2014 election 
| 132
| 82
| 29
| 33
| rowspan=3 | 22
| rowspan=10 | 19
| DNP
| DNP
| 96
! 423
| 27
|-
! style="font-size:85%" | November 27, 2014
| 145
| rowspan=2 | 83
| rowspan=3 | 40
| rowspan=2 | 32
| rowspan=3 | 19
| rowspan=2 | 20
| rowspan=2 | 38
! 418
| 32
|-
! style="font-size:85%" | December 2, 2014
| 147
! 420
| 30

|-
! style="font-size:85%" | February 5, 2015
| 150
| 82
| rowspan=2 | 31
| rowspan=12 | 21
| 18
| rowspan=2 | 42
! 422
| 28
|-

! style="font-size:85%" | June 24, 2015
| 144
| rowspan=11 | 81
| rowspan=10 | 43
| rowspan=2 | 22
| 19
! 422
| 28
|-

! style="font-size:85%" | October 22, 2015
| 142
| rowspan=8 | 26
| rowspan=3 | 20
| 48
! 422
| 28
|-

! style="font-size:85%" | February 13, 2016
| 136
| rowspan=5 | 23
| 53
! 422
| 28
|-

! style="font-size:85%" | April 11, 2016
| 141
| 47
! 422
| 28
|-

! style="font-size:85%" | April 12, 2016
| 145
| rowspan=3 | 19
| 44
! 422
| 28
|-

! style="font-size:85%" | July 19, 2016
| 142
| 42
! 422
| 28
|-

! style="font-size:85%" | September 21, 2016
| 143
| 21
| 46
! 422
| 28
|-

! style="font-size:85%" | December 23, 2016
| 142
|rowspan=4 | 20 
| 24
| 18
| 48
! 422
| 28
|-

! style="font-size:85%" | September 10, 2017
| 138
| 20
| 17
| 51
! 422
| 28
|-

! style="font-size:85%" | July 31, 2017
| 135
| rowspan=2 |25
| rowspan=2 |24
| rowspan=2 |19  
| 55
! 422
| 28
|-

! style="font-size:85%" | November 22, 2018
| 135
| rowspan=1 |38
| rowspan=1 |60
! 422
| 28
|-

! Latest voting share
| 
| 
| 
| 
| 
| 
| 
| 
| 
| 
| 
|-
|colspan="12"|
|-
|}

Coalition

On November 21, 2014, the Petro Poroshenko Bloc, People's Front, Self Reliance, Fatherland, and Radical Party signed a coalition agreement. The coalition consists of a total of 302 deputies, which is more than the constitutional majority required by the constitution. The coalition agreement prioritized on a number of key points, namely:

 the creation of a national police force within a reformed Ministry of Internal Affairs
 integration of Ukraine into the European Union and implementing all points of the Association Agreement
 revoking Ukraine's neutral country status, and pursuing membership in NATO
 abolishing parliamentary immunity, while approving a reformed impeachment process
 establishing the Anti-Corruption Bureau and the National Agency Against Corruption
 reforming of the Ukrzaliznytsia state railroad company
 privatizing the coal mines
 adopting additional tax cuts

 decentralization of the administrative divisions
 conducting mayoral elections in cities with two rounds, while lowering the number of deputies in local councils
 reforming the electoral system based on proportional representation with open party lists
 return Crimea under Ukrainian control and submit international claims against Russia for the Crimean annexation.
 creating permanent Ukrainian armed forces locations in the east, while allocating at least 3 percent of the GDP for defense spending
 conducting decommunization and banning Soviet and Nazi symbols and propaganda

Meanwhile, the parliamentary opposition consists of the Opposition Bloc faction, People's Will, and Revival. The Opposition Bloc represents politicians from the Party of Regions, which formed the Second Azarov Government and the majority caucus in parliament after the 2012 elections.

On May 17, 2019, People's Front exited the ruling coalition in order to prevent the incoming President from dissolving the parliament ahead of schedule.

Committees
On December 4, 2014, the Verkhovna Rada approved the composition of its 27 committees and one special control commission. On December 11, 2014, parliament voted in favor of recalling all of the deputies who voted for the January 16 "dictatorship laws" of the previous convocation from their positions in committee leadership. Deputy Chairman Oksana Syroyid proposed this measure, which was adopted with 264 votes in favor.

 Committee on taxation and customs policy (33)
 Committee on agrarian policy and land relations (30)
 Committee on legal policy and justice (32)
 Committee on budget (27)
 Committee on fuel and energy complex, nuclear policy, and nuclear safety (23)
 Committee on preventing and combating corruption (22)
 Committee on national security and defense (20)
 Committee on transport (20)
 Committee on legislative support of law enforcement (19)
 Committee on state construction, regional policy, and local government (17)
 Committee on economic policy (15)
 Committee on ecological policy, natural resources, and elimination of the consequences of the Chornobyl Catastrophe (15)
 Committee on European Integration (14)
 Committee on financial policy and banking (13)

 Committee on construction, housing and communal services (11)
 Committee on health (11)
 Committee on freedom of speech and information policy (10)
 Committee on foreign affairs (10)
 Committee on industrial policy and entrepreneurship (10)
 Committee on rules and organization of the Verkhovna Rada of Ukraine (10)
 Committee on information and communication (9)
 Committee on veterans and the disabled (9)
 Committee on human rights, national minorities, and international relations (8)
 Committee on social policy, employment and pensions (8)
 Committee on culture and spirituality (7)
 Committee on science and education (7)
 Committee on family, youth and sports (6)
 Special Control Commission of the Verkhovna Rada of Ukraine on privatization (1)

Calls for reform
On December 11, 2014, the Yatsenyuk Government presented its course of action for the following year. It was proposed that the number of deputies in parliament be decreased to 150. According to estimates, adopting such a constitutional amendment would save  million annually (approx.  million). As part of a separate reform effort, the governing coalition proposed removing parliamentary immunity for deputies.

In the Verkhovna Rada, impersonal voting (referred to as button pushing, from the ) has been a serious problem in parliament for many years. The deputies of the current convocation to vote impersonally have already been recognized less than a week into parliament's first session. Members of the nationalist Svoboda political party, which was elected into the parliament's previous convocation, proposed making deputies criminally liable for impersonal voting and banning them from holding any future parliamentary mandates. Members from the coalition's Petro Poroshenko Bloc have also recognized the need to ban impersonal voting.

References

External links
 
 

 
Ukrainian parliaments